Ronald Lee Dickerson Jr. (born August 31, 1971) is an American football coach and former player.  He is the director of football operations and wide receivers coach at the University of West Florida in Pensacola, Florida. He was the head football coach at Gardner–Webb University, a position he held from January 2011 to January 2013.  Dickerson was the first African-American head football coach in the history of the Big South Conference.  He resigned from Gardner–Webb on January 18, 2013 to pursue other opportunities.  He is the son of Ron Dickerson.

Head coaching record

References

External links
 Jackson State profile
 

1971 births
Living people
American football running backs
American football wide receivers
Alabama State Hornets football coaches
Arkansas Razorbacks football players
Gardner–Webb Runnin' Bulldogs football coaches
Jackson State Tigers football coaches
Kansas City Chiefs players
London Monarchs players
Louisiana–Monroe Warhawks football coaches
Missouri State Bears football coaches
Morgan State Bears football coaches
Ole Miss Rebels football coaches
Scottish Claymores players
Temple Owls football coaches
West Florida Argonauts football coaches
Las Vegas Outlaws (XFL) coaches
Players of American football from Denver
Sportspeople from Denver
People from Okfuskee County, Oklahoma
People from State College, Pennsylvania
Players of American football from Pennsylvania
African-American coaches of American football
African-American players of American football
21st-century African-American sportspeople
20th-century African-American sportspeople